Petra Pudová (born 19 April 1987) is a Czech singer and actress. She has performed in films, television, and musicals. As a singer, she works with a band, though she spent 2016 developing her solo singing career. In April 2017 she released a single "One Last Time", and in June 2017 she released her first solo album Say it Out Loud.

Discography
 2017 Say it Out Loud

Filmography
 2006 Experti
 2006 Prachy dělaj člověka
 2007 Kdo hledá, najde  
 2008 Sneženky a machři 2
 2008–2012 Ordinace v růžové zahradě - Angelina Kodatová 
 2013 Cirkus Bukowsky

Musicals and theatre roles
 2005 The Secret – Anežka
 2006 Dobře placená procházka
 2007 Naháči – Anna

References

External links
 
 
 Official Youtube channel
 Czech-Slovak Film Database

1987 births
Living people
People from Uničov
Czech television actresses
21st-century Czech women singers
Czech film actresses
21st-century Czech actresses